Vitaliy Vitsenets (born 3 August 1990) is a Ukrainian football coach and a former midfielder. He is an assistant coach with Russian club FC Arsenal Tula.

Career
A native of west Donbas, Visinets is a product of the Shakhtar Donetsk academy. He played as a striker for Shakhtar. He was also a member of the Ukraine national under-19 football team, and winner of UEFA European Under-19 Championship in 2009.

After his knee injury received in 2013, Visenets became a victim of a doctor's mistake when he had his whole lateral meniscus removed. Following series of surgeries in Spain, Visenets for the next couple of years was preoccupied with rehabilitation. In January 2016 he tried to return to football by participating at FC Oleksandriya trials, but again had problems with his knee.

In July 2016 he retired from professional football career, but one year later, in
July 2017, he renewed it and signed one-year deal with FC Mariupol.

He wasn't able to overcome his knee injury and after the ending of first half of 2017–18 season in FC Mariupol retired for the second time.

References

External links

Profile on official Shakhtar website
 

1990 births
Living people
People from Pershotravensk
Ukrainian footballers
Ukraine youth international footballers
Ukraine under-21 international footballers
Association football forwards
FC Shakhtar Donetsk players
FC Shakhtar-3 Donetsk players
FC Zorya Luhansk players
FC Mariupol players
FC Sevastopol players
Ukrainian Premier League players
Ukrainian Second League players
Sportspeople from Dnipropetrovsk Oblast
Ukrainian football managers
Ukrainian expatriate football managers
Expatriate football managers in Russia
Ukrainian expatriate sportspeople in Russia